In calculus, the trapezoidal rule (also known as the trapezoid rule or trapezium rule; see Trapezoid for more information on terminology) is a technique for approximating the definite integral.

The trapezoidal rule works by approximating the region under the graph of the function
 as a trapezoid and calculating its area. It follows that

The trapezoidal rule may be viewed as the result obtained by averaging the left and right Riemann sums, and is sometimes defined this way. The integral can be even better approximated by partitioning the integration interval, applying the trapezoidal rule to each subinterval, and summing the results. In practice, this "chained" (or "composite") trapezoidal rule  is usually what is meant by "integrating with the trapezoidal rule". Let  be a partition of  such that  and  be the length of the -th subinterval (that is), then 

When the partition has a regular spacing, as is often the case, that is, when all the  have the same value  the formula can be simplified for calculation efficiency by factoring  out:.

The approximation becomes more accurate as the resolution of the partition increases (that is, for larger , all  decrease).

As discussed below, it is also possible to place error bounds on the accuracy of the value of a definite integral estimated using a trapezoidal rule.

History 
A 2016 Science paper reports that the trapezoid rule was in use in Babylon before 50 BCE for integrating the velocity of Jupiter along the ecliptic.

Numerical implementation

Non-uniform grid 
When the grid spacing is non-uniform, one can use the formula

wherein

Uniform grid 
For a domain discretized into  equally spaced panels, considerable simplification may occur. Let

the approximation to the integral becomes

Error analysis

The error of the composite trapezoidal rule is the difference between the value of the integral and the numerical result:

There exists a number ξ between a and b, such that

It follows that if the integrand is concave up (and thus has a positive second derivative), then the error is negative and the trapezoidal rule overestimates the true value. This can also be seen from the geometric picture: the trapezoids include all of the area under the curve and extend over it. Similarly, a concave-down function yields an underestimate because area is unaccounted for under the curve, but none is counted above. If the interval of the integral being approximated includes an inflection point, the error is harder to identify.

An asymptotic error estimate for N → ∞ is given by

Further terms in this error estimate are given by the Euler–Maclaurin summation formula.

Several techniques can be used to analyze the error, including:
Fourier series
Residue calculus
Euler–Maclaurin summation formula
Polynomial interpolation

It is argued that the speed of convergence of the trapezoidal rule reflects and can be used as a definition of classes of smoothness of the functions.

Proof 
Let  be the function such that  is the error of the trapezoidal rule on one of the intervals, . Then

and

Now suppose that  which holds if  is sufficiently smooth. It then follows that

which is equivalent to
, or 

 and 

Using these results, we find

and

Letting  we find

Summing all of the local error terms we find

But we also have

and

so that

Therefore the total error is bounded by

Periodic and peak functions 
The trapezoidal rule converges rapidly for periodic functions. This is an easy consequence of the Euler-Maclaurin summation formula, which says that
if  is  times continuously differentiable with period 

A similar effect is available for peak-like functions, such as Gaussian, Exponentially modified Gaussian and other functions with derivatives at integration limits that can be neglected. The evaluation of the full integral of a Gaussian function by trapezoidal rule with 1% accuracy can be made using just 4 points. Simpson's rule requires 1.8 times more points to achieve the same accuracy.

Although some effort has been made to extend the Euler-Maclaurin summation formula to higher dimensions, the most straightforward proof of the rapid convergence of the trapezoidal rule in higher dimensions is to reduce the problem to that of convergence of Fourier series. For very large dimension, the shows that Monte-Carlo integration is most likely a better choice, but for 2 and 3 dimensions, equispaced sampling is efficient. This is exploited in computational solid state physics where equispaced sampling over primitive cells in the reciprocal lattice is known as  Monkhorst-Pack integration.

"Rough" functions 
For functions that are not in C2, the error bound given above is not applicable. Still, error bounds for such rough functions can be derived, which typically show a slower convergence with the number of function evaluations  than the  behaviour given above. Interestingly, in this case the trapezoidal rule often has sharper bounds than Simpson's rule for the same number of function evaluations.

Applicability and alternatives 
The trapezoidal rule is one of a family of formulas for numerical integration called Newton–Cotes formulas, of which the midpoint rule is similar to the trapezoid rule. Simpson's rule is another member of the same family, and in general has faster convergence than the trapezoidal rule for functions which are twice continuously differentiable, though not in all specific cases. However, for various classes of rougher functions (ones with weaker smoothness conditions), the trapezoidal rule has faster convergence in general than Simpson's rule.

Moreover, the trapezoidal rule tends to become extremely accurate when periodic functions are integrated over their periods, which can be analyzed in various ways. A similar effect is available for peak functions.

For non-periodic functions, however, methods with unequally spaced points such as Gaussian quadrature and Clenshaw–Curtis quadrature are generally far more accurate; Clenshaw–Curtis quadrature can be viewed as a change of variables to express arbitrary integrals in terms of periodic integrals, at which point the trapezoidal rule can be applied accurately.

Example
The following integral is given: 
 

Solution

See also
 Gaussian quadrature
 Newton–Cotes formulas
 Rectangle method
 Romberg's method
 Simpson's rule

Notes

References

External links

Trapezium formula. I.P. Mysovskikh, Encyclopedia of Mathematics, ed. M. Hazewinkel
Notes on the convergence of trapezoidal-rule quadrature
An implementation of trapezoidal quadrature provided by Boost.Math

Numerical integration (quadrature)